Hrachovo (formerly:) is a village and municipality in the Rimavská Sobota District of the Banská Bystrica Region of southern Slovakia. The most important sightseeings are classical churches, evangelical and Roman Catholic, manor house and the castle, which is now in ruins.

Genealogical resources

The records for genealogical research are available at the state archive "Statny Archiv in Banska Bystrica, Slovakia"

 Roman Catholic church records (births/marriages/deaths): 1769-1851 (parish A)
 Greek Catholic church records (births/marriages/deaths): 1713-1883 (parish A)

See also
 List of municipalities and towns in Slovakia

References

External links
 
 
Hrachovo castle information
http://www.e-obce.sk/obec/hrachovo/hrachovo.html
Surnames of living people in Hrachovo

Villages and municipalities in Rimavská Sobota District